Shahrak-e Esteqlal (also Romanized as Shahrak-e Esteqlāl) is a village in Derak Rural District, in the Central District of Shiraz County, Fars Province, Iran. At the 2006 census, its population was 6,519, in 1,617 families.

References 

Populated places in Shiraz County